The Iran–Turkmenistan border  is 1,148 km (713 miles) in length and runs from the Caspian Sea to the tripoint with Afghanistan. The Turkmen capital Ashgabat is only 15 miles north of this boundary, and Mashhad (Iran's second largest city) is 47 miles south of it.

Description
The border starts at the Caspian coast just to the south of the Turkmen town of Esenguly. It then goes overland in an eastwards directions in a series of straight lines through barren salt flats for 50 km (31m) until reaching the Atrek river, the course of which it follows for 124 km (77m) to a point just south of the Turkmen village of Chat. The border then continues overland eastwards/north-eastwards across the Kopet Dag mountain range for 151 km (94m) before reaching the Sumbar river, the course of which it then follows for 41 km (26m). It then continues overland across mountain ridges in a broadly south-eastern arc for 455 km (283m) to the vicinity of the Iranian village of Chahchaheh. From here a roughly straight line section runs for 77 km (48m) to the Harirud river (Tedzhen in Turkmen), the course of which it follows south for 120 km (75m) to the Afghan tripoint.

The immediate border area is largely uninhabited, except for the central section around Ashgabat on the Turkmen side; this area of the border, plus the western section, is roughly paralleled by highways. The Turkmen section of the Trans-Caspian Railway also roughly parallels the frontier in the central section, coming less than half a mile north of the boundary in the vicinity of Lotfabad. On the Iranian side, roughly 50 miles south of the border runs the major highways connecting the towns of Gorgan, Bojnurd and Mashhad, with roads connecting the smaller towns to the north.

History
The border was inherited from the old Persia-USSR border, which largely took its current shape during the 19th Century after the Russian conquest of Central Asia and its annexation of the Khanate of Kokand and the Emirate of Bukhara in 1865–68. In 1869 Persia and Russia agreed that the Atrek river would be the border between them. This boundary was confirmed and then extended eastwards to the vicinity of Ashgabat in 1881 following further Russian advances into Turkmen lands, and then to the border with Afghanistan in 1893; various further delimitations of this border occurred in the following years. Further small changes were made in the period 1954-57 when Iran and the USSR (as they now were) agreed to more clearly demarcate their common border, including the Atrek delta region which had since altered due to the shrinking of the Caspian Sea.

Border crossings
 Bajgiran (IRN) – Bajgiran (TKM) (road)
Sarakhs (IRN) – Serakhs (TKM) (road)
 Lotfabad (IRN) – Artyk (TKM) (road)

Settlements near the border

Iran

 Gomishan
 Incheh Borun
 Bachcheh Darreh
 Hesarcheh
 Robat, Zavin
 Shuy, Razavi Khorasan
 Lotfabad
 Now Khandan
 Dargaz
 Giru
 Koshtani
 Qarah Takan, Razavi Khorasan
 Chahchaheh
 Alamtu
 Sarakhs
 Shir Tappeh
 Jannatabad, Torbat-e Jam

Turkmenistan

 Esenguly
 Ajyyap
 Gyzyletrek
 Chat
 Kuruzhdey
 Khodzhakala
 Kënekesir
 Shemli
 Kazgan
 Arab-Kala
 Hawdan
 Kaka
 Dushak
 Miana
 Imeni Kuliyev
 Akhchadepe
 Karaman Vtoroy
 Kichiga Vtoraya
 Serakhs
 Polekhatum

See also
 Treaty of Akhal
 Iran-Turkmenistan relations

References

 
Turkmenistan
Borders of Turkmenistan
International borders